The Cosmic Rape is a science fiction novel by American writer Theodore Sturgeon, originally published as an original paperback in August 1958. At the same time, a condensed or edited-down version of the novel was published in Galaxy magazine as a short novel, probably condensed by the editor, under the title To Marry Medusa. It was reprinted in 1977 by Pocket Books.

Plot
The book concerns an extraterrestrial hive mind named Medusa, which has assimilated many worlds and life forms and plans to absorb Earth as well. Dan Gurlick is an alcoholic who unknowingly ingests a spore from Medusa, which turns him into a host.

References

Paul Williams, ed. The Man Who Lost the Sea, Volume X: The Complete Stories of Theodore Sturgeon, p. 333. Berkeley, CA: North Atlantic Books, 2005.

External links
 To Marry Medusa at the Internet Archive

1958 American novels
1958 science fiction novels
Novels by Theodore Sturgeon
Alien invasions in novels
Hive minds in fiction